Drainage is the natural or artificial removal of a surface's water and sub-surface water from an area with excess  of water. The internal drainage of most agricultural soils is good enough to prevent severe waterlogging (anaerobic conditions that harm root growth), but many soils need artificial drainage to improve production or to manage water supplies.

History

Early history

The Indus Valley civilization had sewerage and drainage systems. All houses in the major cities of Harappa and Mohenjo-daro had access to water and drainage facilities. Waste water was directed to covered gravity sewers, which lined the major streets.

18th and 19th century

The invention of hollow-pipe drainage is credited to Sir Hugh Dalrymple, who died in 1753.

Current practices

Geotextiles
New storm water drainage systems incorporate geotextile filters that retain and prevent fine grains of soil from passing into and clogging the drain. Geotextiles are synthetic textile fabrics specially manufactured for civil and environmental engineering applications. Geotextiles are designed to retain fine soil particles while allowing water to pass through. In a typical drainage system, they would be laid along a trench which would then be filled with coarse granular material: gravel, sea shells, stone or rock. The geotextile is then folded over the top of the stone and the trench is then covered by soil. Groundwater seeps through the geotextile and flows through the stone to an outfell. In high groundwater conditions a perforated plastic (PVC or PE) pipe is laid along the base of the drain to increase the volume of water transported in the drain.

Alternatively, a prefabricated plastic drainage system made of HDPE, often incorporating geotextile, coco fiber or rag filters can be considered. The use of these materials has become increasingly more common due to their ease of use which eliminates the need for transporting and laying stone drainage aggregate which is invariably more expensive than a synthetic drain and concrete liners.

Over the past 30 years geotextile, PVC filters and HDPE filters have become the most commonly used soil filter media. They are cheap to produce and easy to lay, with factory controlled properties that ensure long term filtration performance even in fine silty soil conditions.

21st century alternatives
Seattle's Public Utilities created a pilot program called Street Edge Alternatives (SEA Streets) Project. The project focuses on designing a system "to provide drainage that more closely mimics the natural landscape prior to development than traditional piped systems".
The streets are characterized by ditches along the side of the roadway, with plantings designed throughout the area.
An emphasis on non curbed sidewalks allows water to flow more freely into the areas of permeable surface on the side of the streets. Because of the plantings, the run off water from the urban area does not all directly go into the ground, but can also be absorbed into the surrounding environment.
Monitoring conducted by Seattle Public Utilities reports a 99 percent reduction of storm water leaving the drainage project

Drainage has undergone a large-scale environmental review in the recent past in the United Kingdom. Sustainable Urban Drainage Systems (SUDS) are designed to encourage contractors to install drainage system that more closely mimic the natural flow of water in nature.  Since 2010 local and neighbourhood planning in the UK is required by law to factor SUDS into any development projects that they are responsible for.

Slot drainage has proved the most breakthrough product of the last twenty years as a drainage option. As a channel drainage system it is designed to eliminate the need for further pipework systems to be installed in parallel to the drainage, reducing the environmental impact of production as well as improving water collection. Stainless steel, concrete channel, PVC and HDPE are all materials available for slot drainage which have become industry standards on construction projects.

Drainage in the construction industry

The civil engineer is responsible for drainage in construction projects. They set out from the plans all the roads, street gutters, drainage, culverts and sewers involved in construction operations. During the construction process they will set out all the necessary levels for each of the previously mentioned factors.

Civil engineers and construction managers work alongside architects and supervisors, planners, quantity surveyors, the general workforce, as well as subcontractors.  Typically, most jurisdictions have some body of drainage law to govern to what degree a landowner can alter the drainage from his parcel.

Drainage options for the construction industry include: 
 Point drainage, which intercepts water at gullies (points). Gullies connect to drainage pipes beneath the ground surface and deep excavation is required to facilitate this system. Support for deep trenches is required in the shape of planking, strutting or shoring.
 Channel drainage, which intercepts water along the entire run of the channel. Channel drainage is typically manufactured from concrete, steel, polymer or composites. The interception rate of channel drainage is greater than point drainage and the excavation required is usually much less deep.
The surface opening of channel drainage usually comes in the form of gratings (polymer, plastic, steel or iron) or a single slot (slot drain) that runs along the ground surface (typically manufactured from steel or iron).
Review process

Drainage in retaining walls 
Earth retaining structures such as retaining walls also need to consider groundwater drainage. Typical retaining walls are constructed of impermeable material which can block the path of groundwater. When groundwater flow is obstructed, hydrostatic water pressure buildups against the wall and may cause significant damage. If the water pressure is not drained appropriately, retaining walls can bow, move, fracture and seams separate. The water pressure can also erode soil particles leading to voids behind the wall and sinkholes in the above soil. Traditional retaining wall drainage systems can include, French Drains, drain pipes or weep holes. To prevent soil erosion, Geotextile filter fabrics are installed with the drainage system.

Reasons for artificial drainage

Wetland soils may need drainage to be used for agriculture. In the northern United States and Europe, glaciation created numerous small lakes which gradually filled with humus to make marshes. Some of these were drained using open ditches and trenches to make mucklands, which are primarily used for high value crops such as vegetables.

The largest project of this type in the world has been in process for centuries in the Netherlands. The area between Amsterdam, Haarlem and Leiden was, in prehistoric times swampland and small lakes. Turf cutting (Peat mining), subsidence and shoreline erosion gradually caused the formation of one large lake, the Haarlemmermeer, or lake of Haarlem. The invention of wind-powered pumping engines in the 15th century permitted drainage of some of the marginal land, but the final drainage of the lake had to await the design of large, steam powered pumps and agreements between regional authorities. The elimination of the lake occurred between 1849 and 1852, creating thousands of km2 of new land.

Coastal plains and river deltas may have seasonally or permanently high water tables and must have drainage improvements if they are to be used for agriculture. An example is the flatwoods citrus-growing region of Florida. After periods of high rainfall, drainage pumps are employed to prevent damage to the citrus groves from overly wet soils. Rice production requires complete control of water, as fields need to be flooded or drained at different stages of the crop cycle. The Netherlands has also led the way in this type of drainage, not only to drain lowland along the shore, but actually pushing back the sea until the original nation has been greatly enlarged.

In moist climates, soils may be adequate for cropping with the exception that they become waterlogged for brief periods each year, from snow melt or from heavy rains. Soils that are predominantly clay will pass water very slowly downward, meanwhile plant roots suffocate because the excessive water around the roots eliminates air movement through the soil.
Other soils may have an impervious layer of mineralized soil, called a hardpan or relatively impervious rock layers may underlie shallow soils. Drainage is especially important in tree fruit production. Soils that are otherwise excellent may be waterlogged for a week of the year, which is sufficient to kill fruit trees and cost the productivity of the land until replacements can be established. In each of these cases appropriate drainage carries off temporary flushes of water to prevent damage to annual or perennial crops.

Drier areas are often farmed by irrigation, and one would not consider drainage necessary. However, irrigation water always contains minerals and salts, which can be concentrated to toxic levels by evapotranspiration. Irrigated land may need periodic flushes with excessive irrigation water and drainage to control soil salinity.

See also

 Bar ditch
 Building construction
 Deep drainage
 Drain commissioner
 Drain (plumbing)
 Drainage basin or watershed
 Drainage by wells
 Drainage divide or watershed
 Drainage equation
 Drainage research
 Drainage system (agriculture)
 Drainage system (geomorphology)
 Geomorphology
 Hydrologic Evaluation of Landfill Performance (HELP)
 Hydrology
 John Johnston, who introduced land drainage to the United States.
 Plumbing
 Potable cold and hot water supply
 Septic systems
 Sewage traps, drains, and vents
 Rain gutter
 Retaining wall
 Sewage collection and disposal
 Soil salinity control by subsurface drainage
 Tile drainage
 Trench drain
 Trencher (machine)
 Urban exploration
 Watertable control

References

External links

 
Water management